San Pellegrino may refer to:

 S.Pellegrino, an Italian natural mineral water brand
 San Pellegrino (cycling team), an Italian professional cycling team that existed from 1956 to 1963
 San Pellegrino Terme, comune in the province of Bergamo, Lombardy, Italy 
 Passo San Pellegrino, an Italian pass in the Alps
 San Pellegrino di Belluno, a quarter in Belluno
 San Pellegrino University Foundation
 San Pellegrino Awards

Architecture 

 San Pellegrino in Alpe, a Roman Catholic church and adjacent hostel-hospital complex in Castiglione di Garfagnana, province of Lucca, region of Tuscany, Italy
 San Pellegrino alla Sapienza, a Gothic style, Roman Catholic church located in Siena, region of Tuscany, Italy
 San Pellegrino in Vaticano, an ancient Roman Catholic oratory in the Vatican City